Rome Free Academy (commonly abbreviated as RFA) is a public high school located in Rome, New York, United States, at the former site of Griffiss Air Force Base. The school opened at this location in September 2002, having previously been located at 500 Turin St. This former site is the current location of Rome Free Academy's athletic facilities. During the 2018–2019 academic year the school enrolled 1,482 students in grades nine through twelve. It serves as the high school for the city of Rome.

Rome Free Academy offers a general high school education through a regular curriculum of mathematics, social studies, English, science, art, music, health, and a selected foreign language. Rome Free Academy also includes a multiple business classes.

Rome Free Academy's sports teams are called the Black Knights. The school's athletic colors are black and orange. 
Notable in recent history is the addition of a comprehensive Positive Behavior Initiatives and Support (PBIS) initiative, which includes a range of measures to help solve student behavioral problems.

Notable alumni
Orlando J. Illi, Jr U.S. Army Officer Candidate School (OCS) Hall of Fame Inductee (April 2019)
Don Healy, former NFL player
Rob Manfred, commissioner of Major League Baseball
Tom Myslinski, former NFL player
Edyth Walker, opera singer with the Metropolitan Opera and Vienna State Opera
Bonnie Thunders, Roller Derby player
Tim Russ, Actor
Aryanna Piatt, co-Manager of Lizzo 
Noah "Nifty" Francis, Professional CS:GO player, currently playing for Team Envy in North America

References

Public high schools in New York (state)
Rome, New York
Schools in Oneida County, New York
1869 establishments in New York (state)
Educational institutions established in 1869